Yes Drama (styled as yes Drama and formerly called yes stars Drama) is an Israeli television channel carried by the Israeli satellite television provider yes, which broadcasts American, British, Canadian and Israeli TV shows of the dramas, lifestyle and reality genres. The channel aired on December 14, 2008 on channel 12 as part of the latest television shows' channels re-brand by yes. The channel is a split of the former yes stars 1 to the current yes Drama and yes Comedy. The channel airs the shows' new episodes on weeknights (Sundays - Thursdays), and its re-runs on weekdays and weekends (Fridays - Saturdays).

yes Drama schedule is being simulcast in High Definition on yes Drama HD on channel 16.

Picture Formats 

yes Drama airs shows in 4 formats:
 Normal (4:3)
 Letterboxed (4:3)
 Pan & Scan (4:3)
 Widescreen (16:9)

In order to watch widescreen (16:9) shows on a 4:3 TV, there are 3 options to choose from: 
 4:3 Letterbox (Widescreen with black bars - Original Aspect Ratio)
 16:9 (Anamorphic Widescreen)
 4:3 (Pan & scan)

Choosing the format of the picture is in the digital set-top box setup. The setup does not affect shows which are not broadcast in Widescreen.

yes Drama HD airs the shows in High Definition 1080i and in widescreen (16:9) at all times. Shows that are not shot in HD are upscaled to 1080i.

History of the channel 

On March 4, 2007, yes replaced the channel yes+ - which has been cancelled on March 3, 2007 after six and a half years - with yes stars 1, as part of the re-brand of the foreign TV shows channels and expanding yesSTARS to 3 channels - yes stars 1, yes stars 2 and yes stars 3.

On March 14, 2008, as part of a new re-brand of the television shows channels on yes, yes stars 1 obtained a new logo.

On December 14, 2008, as part of another re-brand of the channels, yes stars 1 was replaced with yes stars Drama, and as of April 22, 2009 simulcast its entire schedule in High Definition on yes stars Drama HD, replacing Yes Stars HD, which aired most of the channel's shows in HD.

On August 20, 2010, the word stars was removed from the channel name.

Shows broadcast on yes Drama

External links

Television channels in Israel
Yes (Israel)